Huaso or Wasu (Quechua) is one of four districts of the province Julcán in Peru.

References